Peter Anders Abrahamsson (born 18 July 1988) is a Swedish professional footballer who plays for BK Häcken as a goalkeeper.

Honours 
BK Häcken
 Allsvenskan: 2022

References

External links
 
 

1988 births
Living people
Association football goalkeepers
Örgryte IS players
BK Häcken players
Swedish men's footballers
Sweden international footballers
Sweden youth international footballers
Superettan players
Allsvenskan players